Crandall is a city in Kaufman County, Texas, United States. Its population was 3,860 in 2020.  It is part of the Dallas-Fort Worth metroplex. Crandall is named after Cornelius F. Crandall, who had previously founded Crandall, Indiana

Geography

Crandall is located in western Kaufman County at  (32.627407, –96.453276). U.S. Route 175 passes through the north side of the city, leading northwest  to the center of Dallas and southeast  to Kaufman.

Demographics

As of the 2020 United States census, 3,860 people, 1,149 households, and 968 families resided in the city.

Education
The city is served by the Crandall Independent School District (ISD). Schools in the Crandall ISD are Hollis T. Dietz Elementary School, W.A. Martin Elementary School, Noble-Reed Elementary School, Barbara Walker Elementary School, Nola Kathryn Wilson Elementary School, Crandall Middle School, Crandall High School, and Crandall Compass Academy.

Climate
The climate in this area is characterized by hot, humid summers and generally mild to cool winters.  According to the Köppen climate classification, Crandall has a humid subtropical climate, Cfa on climate maps.

In popular culture
Bonnie and Clyde and Boys Don't Cry (1999 film)|Boys Don't Cry each filmed scenes in Crandall, while the episode "1800 Days to Justice" of Route 66 was filmed completely in Crandall, but takes place in the fictional town of Harcourt Junction.

Notable people

 Julia Morales, on ROOT Sports, is from Crandall and reports for the Houston Astros.

References

External links
City of Crandall official website
Crandall Chamber of Commerce
Crandall Economic Development
SeagovilleNews.com, nearby news website

Dallas–Fort Worth metroplex
Cities in Texas
Cities in Kaufman County, Texas
U.S. Route 175